Gamify is an Australian Children's TV program which airs on 10 Peach on Network 10. It is hosted by Jesse Baird (J.B.) and premiered on 22 February 2019 on 10 Peach at 8 am. The show follows three teen adventurers (who are 12—14 years), who have been picked by the Global Expedition Organisation (GEO) to engage in a mission.

They must complete many action-packed, real-world adventure challenges to beat the game to win a prize, which have included an Event Cinemas ticket for the group, vouchers to iPlay Adventure Australia, gift cards for EB Games, Kingpin Bowling or Urban Xtreme and special game prize packs from uGames Australia. The participants must help GEO in their fight against the HAVOC Organisation (also known as Anarchy Labs) by completing the 3 different challenges and ranking as high as possible.

Series overview

Broadcast History
From 22 February 2019 – 2020, the show aired on 10 Peach from Friday–Sunday, at 8 am on Fridays, 8:30 am on Saturdays and at 10:30 am on Sundays.

Cast
 Jesse Baird as host, known as J.B.
 Emily Dickson as Vicki Volt, Arcadia Steele, Agent Storm, Eve Doom & Elizah Wolf
 Jack Kelly as CJ Clamp, Dr Niles Ice, Bruce Bass & Agent 19
 Brooke Marsden as Magenta Crowe, Sandra Stone & Zero
 Stacey Thomson as Savannah Hart
 Elizah Caruana as Penelope Fox

References

Australian children's television series
10 Peach original programming
2019 Australian television series debuts
Television shows set in Brisbane
2010s Australian game shows